Leningrad udelivaet Ameriku Disk 2 ( ('Leningrad Does America (Disc 2)) is a 2003 album by the Russian band Leningrad.

Track listing
"Alkogolik" (Alcoholic) – 2:34
"Bez tebya" (Without you) – 3:43
"Banani" (Bananas) – 5:09
"Komon evribadi" (C'mon everybody) (Russian transliteration) – 3:09 
"Ya - tvoy kovboy" (I'm your cowboy) – 3:19 
"SKA" (Sports Club of the Army) – 2:25  
"007" – 3:23  
"Rezinoviy muzhik" (Rubber dude) – 3:05
"Zvezda rok-n-rolla" (Rock n' Roll star) – 3:46  
"Vse eto reyv" (It is all a rave) – 5:02
"Sobaka Baskerviley" (Hound of the Baskervilles) – 3:15
"Shou-biznes" (Show Business) (Russian Transliteration) – 9:52

Leningrad (band) albums
2003 live albums